Merging Technologies is a Swiss manufacturer of professional audio hardware and software.

History
Merging Technologies was founded in 1990 in Puidoux, Vaud, by EPFL electrical engineering graduate Claude Cellier.

In 2022, Merging Technologies was acquired by Sennheiser.

Digital eXtreme Definition
DXD (Digital eXtreme Definition) is a digital audio format that originally was developed by Philips and Merging Technologies for editing high-resolution recordings recorded in DSD, the audio standard used on Super Audio CD (SACD).

Products

Hardware 
Hardware manufactured by Merging includes the following:
 MERGING+ANUBIS (Networked AD/DA audio interface)
 Horus (Networked AD/DA audio interface)
 Hapi (Networked AD/DA audio interface)
 Hapi MkII (Networked AD/DA audio interface)
 MERGING+NADAC (Audiophile DAC)
 Mykerinos (DSP card, now discontinued)
 DUA & DUAII (AD/DA converters, now discontinued)
 Sphynx & Sphynx 2 (AD/DA converters, now discontinued)

Software 
Merging develops software products which include the following:

 Pyramix: a digital audio workstation (DAW)
 Ovation: a media server and sequencer
 VCube: a video player and recorder
 ANEMAN: an Audio Network Manager.

See Also
 DXD
 AES67#Adoption
 Direct Stream Digital#DSD_technique

References

External links 
 

Electronics companies established in 1990
Manufacturing companies established in 1990
Manufacturers of professional audio equipment
Audio equipment manufacturers of Switzerland